West is a Canadian documentary television series that aired on CBC Television from 1973 to 1974.

Premise
This series of National Film Board of Canada productions featured life on the Canadian prairie provinces (Alberta, Manitoba and Saskatchewan).

Scheduling
This half-hour series was broadcast Wednesdays at 10:00 p.m. from 19 December 1973 to 17 April 1974. There were rebroadcasts from 23 June 1974, Sundays at 1:00 p.m..

Episodes
 "Catskinner Keen" (Donald Brittain producer and director), featuring Bob Keen
 "Cavendish Country" (Donald Brittain producer and director), about Cal Cavendish, a country musician
 "Every Saturday Night" (John Taylor producer; Tom Radford director), concerning the Depression-era hoedown band the Badlanders
 "I Don't Have to Work that Big" (John N. Smith producer; Michael McKennirey director), featuring Joe Fafard's sculpting
 "The Jews of Winnipeg" (John N. Smith producer; Bill Davies director), a community profile with interviews of entertainer David Steinberg, singer Judy Lander and lawyer Joseph Zuken
 "The New Boys" (John N. Smith producer and director), featuring Saint John's Cathedral Boys' School in Selkirk, Manitoba
 "Ruth and Harriet: Two Women of the Peace" (Cynthia Scott producer; Barbara Greene director), set in the Peace River Country area of Alberta, profiling two of the homesteading women
 "Some Natives of Churchill" (Cynthia Scott producer and director), concerning life in Churchill, Manitoba
 "Starblanket" (Donald Brittain producer and director), a profile of First Nations reserve chief Noel Starblanket
 "This Riel Business" (Ian McLaren producer and director), featuring Regina's Globe Theatre production of Tales from a Prairie Drifter, a comedy play set in the North-West Rebellion and features Louis Riel as a character
 "Van's Camp" (Les Rose and Donald Brittain, producers and directors), set in a Lac la Ronge, Saskatchewan fishing camp
 "We're Here To Stay" (Ian McLaren producer and director), set in Lestock, Saskatchewan, featuring the efforts of farmers to run their Agri-Pool farm cooperative

See also
 Adieu Alouette
 Pacificanada

References

External links
 

CBC Television original programming
1973 Canadian television series debuts
1974 Canadian television series endings
National Film Board of Canada documentary series
1970s Canadian documentary television series
Films set in the Canadian Prairies
Cultural depictions of Louis Riel